Halflives is an alternative rock band originally from Modena, Italy but now based in Paris, France. After releasing their debut 8-track record "Empty Rooms" in 2017, they toured Europe and the UK supporting Courage My Love. In 2018 they headlined several tours in mainland Europe and the UK and released two standalone singles "Crown" and "Fugitive". Early in 2019 they toured in the UK supporting The Faim and Chapel and appeared at Rock for People. In 2020 they released their EP "Resilience", including the single "Time Bomb" featuring Kellin Quinn from Sleeping with Sirens. They toured Europe early 2020 with Icon for Hire and released their single "Villain" in November of that year. Their next EP "V" came out on July 2nd 2021 and includes the singles "Victim", "Vibe", "Valkyrie" and "Villain".

With the release of "V", lead vocalist Linda Battilani announced that bassist Oscar Scantamburlo and drummer Fede Bernardi had moved from producing members to touring members of the band.

Members

Current members
 Linda Battilani – lead vocals, piano, keyboards (2016-present), guitar (2019-present)

Touring members
 Oscar Scantamburlo – bass, keyboards, percussion (2016-present), guitar (2019-present)
 Fede Bernardi – drums (2016-present)
 Enrico Tosti – guitar (2021-present)

Former members
 Matteo "Matt" Mantovani - guitar, piano (2016-2017)
 Enrico Bertoni - guitar, backing vocals (2016-2018)
 Antonin "Tony" Carré - guitar, backing vocals (2018-2019)

Discography

EPs
Empty Rooms (2017)
Resilience (2020)
V (2021)

Singles
"Mayday" (2016), on Empty Rooms
"Burn" (2016), on Empty Rooms
"Echo" (2017), on Empty Rooms
"Crown" (2018)
"Fugitive" (2018)
"Rockstar Everyday" (2019), on Resilience
"Snake" (2020), on Resilience
"Hard to Break" (2020), on Resilience
"Time Bomb" (2020), on Resilience
"Rockstar Everyday (MC4D Remix)" (2020)
"Fugitive (Reimagined)" (2020)
"Villain" (2020), on V
"Everyday Rockstars" (Vini Vici vs. Ranji) (2021)
"Vibe" (2021), 
"Victim" (2021), 
"Valkyrie" (2021),
”Dynamite” (2022),
"Sorry Mom X" (2022).

References

Musical groups established in 2016
Musical groups from Paris
French alternative rock groups
2016 establishments in France
French musical trios
Female-fronted musical groups